Matthew Green (born 17 October 1975) is a British journalist and author. He was raised in Hampton Middlesex where he attended Hampton School before he studied African politics at Oxford University and spent five years on the ground in East Africa reporting for Reuters. He is currently the South Asia Security Correspondent for the Financial Times.
Matthew's first book, entitled The Wizard of the Nile: The Hunt for Africa’s Most Wanted, documents his search through the war zone of Uganda for Joseph Kony, the mysterious rebel leader known for abducting children and using them as child soldiers.

From 2007 to 2009, he was based in Lagos as the West Africa correspondent for the Financial Times. In September 2009, Matthew took up a new assignment as the FT's South Asia Security Correspondent, covering Afghanistan and Pakistan from Kabul and Islamabad. He also reported from the frontline in the last Iraq War whilst embedded with US marines.

Articles 
 Matthew Green in the Financial Times: 
 On influencing oil markets:

Reviews

Sources

External links

British male journalists
Living people
1975 births